The 1923 Washington State Cougars football team represented Washington State College (renamed Washington State University in 1959) in the Pacific Coast Conference (PCC) during the 1923 college football season. In its first season under head coach Albert Exendine, the team compiled a 2–4–1 record (1–3–1 against PCC opponents), finished in a tie for sixth place in the PCC, and was outscored by their opponents by a combined total of 84 to 56. The team's victories were over Pacific (19-0) and Oregon (13-7).

Schedule

References

Washington State
Washington State Cougars football seasons
Washington State Cougars football